Ostseebad Binz is a terminus railway station in the town of Binz, Mecklenburg-Vorpommern, Germany. The station lies at the end of the Lietzow-Binz railway and was opened in 1939. The train services are operated by Deutsche Bahn Fernverkehr and Ostdeutsche Eisenbahn GmbH.

History 

The station building was completed in 1938. A year later Deutsche Reichsbahn officially opened the railway station together with the Lietzow–Binz railway. Due to the Second World War, however, initially only a few trains operated. There were two pairs of trains per day in 1940. When the war was over, the track was dismantled for reparations and thus the station was also closed. However, it was rebuilt within a few years, so the station became operational again in 1952.

During the time of the GDR, the station was regularly served by express trains. The line was electrified in 1989 because of its relatively high importance for national and international long-distance traffic.

The first Intercity services stopped in Binz station in 1991. In 2000, a fundamental restructuring of the station was completed, including the rebuilding of the platforms. These works cost about 9.5 million Marks.

In March 2011, Binz station was connected to Deutsche Bahn’s Intercity-Express network, with a weekly train pair to Munich.

Infrastructure

The station has three platform tracks. Platform track 2, which is a through track, and track 4, which is a bay platform and just north of the station building, are 55 cm high and attached to the station building. Platform 2 is 344 m long and platform 4 is 171 m long. Platform 3 is a side platform on a through track, which is connected by a protected passenger level crossing with the main platform. The side platform is 315 m long and 76 cm high. Between tracks 2 and 3 there Is a third through track, track 1. This is used exclusively for running through the station to the end of the track, 150 m to the south. Long-distance trains always stop on platforms 2 and 3 and regional trains stop on platform 4. North of the station there is a parking area. The signals are controlled by the electronic control centre in Lietzow. The station forecourt is served by several bus routes that are operated by Rügener Personennahverkehrs GmbH (RPNV). In addition, there is a taxi rank.

Rail services
In 2011, about 40 to 50 trains a day stopped at Binz station. Services as of 2023 are as follows:

Until the timetable change in December 2016, Ostseebad Binz was often served the summer by a night train to and from destinations in southern Germany that are often changed. During July/August 2014, the Zurich–Berlin City Night Line service was extended once a week to Ostseebad Binz (arriving/departing Rügen on Saturday).

References

Railway stations in Mecklenburg-Western Pomerania
Binz
Railway stations in Germany opened in 1939
Buildings and structures in Vorpommern-Rügen